Chula Prieto (1929–1960) was a Mexican film actress.

Selected filmography
 My General's Women (1951)
 You Had To Be a Gypsy (1953)
 Your Memory and Me (1953)
 The Plebeian (1953)

References

Bibliography
  Rogelio Agrasánchez. Beauties of Mexican Cinema. Agrasanchez Film Archive, 2001.

External links

1929 births
1960 deaths
Mexican film actresses